The 1894 Ole Miss Rebels football team represented the University of Mississippi as an independent during the 1894 college football season.  The season's only loss was to Vanderbilt.

Schedule

References

Ole Miss
Ole Miss Rebels football seasons
Ole Miss Rebels football